Shumashti – also known as Shumasht – is an Indo-Aryan language spoken in eastern Afghanistan. It is spoken in parts of Kunar Province: on the western side of the Kunar Valley between Jalalabad and the Pech Valley. The number of speakers was estimated at 1,000 in 1994.

It has been influenced by the Northeast Pashai languages, and it is related to the Grangali language, with which it shares about a third of its basic vocabulary, and to Gawar-Bati, with which it has about half of its basic lexis in common.

References

Dardic languages
Languages of Afghanistan